This is a list of airports in Wallis and Futuna.

Wallis and Futuna is an overseas collectivity (collectivité d'outre-mer or COM) of France located in the South Pacific between Fiji and Samoa.

The capital of Wallis and Futuna is Mata-Utu, which is located on Wallis Island.



Airports 

ICAO location identifiers are linked to each airport's Aeronautical Information Publication (AIP), which are available online in Portable Document Format (PDF) from the French Service d'information aéronautique (SIA). Locations shown in bold are as per the airport's AIP page. Most airports give two locations: the first is the city served, second is the city where the airport is located.

See also 
 List of airports in France
 List of airports by ICAO code: N#NL - Wallis and Futuna

References 
French Civil Aviation site:
Aeronautical Information Service / Service d'information aéronautique (SIA) 
Aeronautical Information Publications (AIP) 
Union des Aéroports Français

External links
Lists of airports in Wallis and Futuna:
Aircraft Charter World
The Airport Guide
FallingRain.com

 
Wallis and Futuna
Airports
Wallis and Futuna
Wallis and Futuna